Servilio Torres (born 14 May 1938) is a Cuban former sports shooter. He competed in the skeet event at the 1972 Summer Olympics.

References

External links
 

1938 births
Living people
Cuban male sport shooters
Olympic shooters of Cuba
Shooters at the 1972 Summer Olympics
Place of birth missing (living people)
Pan American Games medalists in shooting
Pan American Games gold medalists for Cuba
Pan American Games silver medalists for Cuba
Pan American Games bronze medalists for Cuba
Shooters at the 1971 Pan American Games
Shooters at the 1975 Pan American Games
20th-century Cuban people